Miroslav Šimonovič (born 10 August 1977) is a former Slovak professional ice hockey goaltender.

Awards and honors

External links

1977 births
Living people
Slovak ice hockey goaltenders
HK Poprad players
HC Košice players
MsHK Žilina players
HKM Zvolen players
HC '05 Banská Bystrica players
Olympic ice hockey players of Slovakia
Ice hockey players at the 1998 Winter Olympics
Sportspeople from Poprad
Slovak expatriate ice hockey players in the Czech Republic